A Madonna in Laleli is a 1998 Turkish drama film, written and directed by Kudret Sabancı, about a pimp and his two friends who try to sell a Russian prostitute as a “virgin” to a rich businessman.

Production
The film was shot on location in Laleli, Istanbul, Turkey.

References

External links
 
 TurkishFilmChannel page for the film

1998 films
Turkish drama films
1990s Turkish-language films
1998 drama films
Films set in Turkey
Films set in Istanbul
1999 drama films
1999 films